Transiteatret-Bergen (Transit) is a theatre ensemble based in Bergen, Norway.

Transiteatret-Bergen (Transit) works under the artistic direction of playwright and director Tore Vagn Lid with the development of a contemporary theatre working in the intersection between theatre and music. Transit constitute an artistic production-network,  comprising director, sound-,video- designer, set designers, moviemakers, actors and musicians – mainly working with base in Lids concepts and plays . The core artistic ambition has been "to expand the theatre room as a critical room of experience, where the musical and musical dramaturgic potential of the theatre is the most central". Tt-B has since its foundation in 2001 carried out over 20 scenic experiments and award-winning productions. The company has been presented i several European countries, and was the first Norwegian company to perform at the Salzburg Festival ("Measures Taken", Young directors project 2008).

Biography

The work of Transiteatret- Bergen (Tt-B) is committed to a breed of music and theatre that opens and enables a critically experimental theatre directed towards crucial questions of what is at stake in contemporary society. Starting from the idea of theatre as a synthesis of stagecraft and music, tt-b has through the conceptual and directorial lead of Tore Vagn Lid presented a range of performances touching on, and always continuously developing, themes of relations between man/woman and what seems to be dominating forces of our economical and cultural surroundings.  In the performances this often appears through a displaying of  the subtle and unsubtle demands made on the individual in an increasingly mediatized, capitalized, and perhaps too a critical extent, human-alienating world.

Through the early works like "Opus 1. Maktens Anatomi" (2001), "Walk, Cat, Walk!" (2003/2003), and "Maybe it´s too nice?" (2004), a highly developed dramaturgical thinking, and theatrework of unique and solid character made its mark in the Norwegian theatre-landscape. A mark which proved to be continuously deepening and widening through the more recent productions of "Polyfonia" (2007), "Die Maßnahme" (2007) and "Mann=Mann" (2008). These performances broke still new ground for tt-b, as seen through an increasing appreciation of their work by critics, as well as a Norwegian and European audience, for being remarkably thought-provoking work that still offers an atmosphere of amiability and humour in its approach to the audience. Not the least, the performances tends to come through as reminders of how artistic approaches to the political and ideological workings of society, can reveal and discuss these workings in crucial ways - beyond the realms of politics and news-reports, where the individual is challenged to question and possibly refigure its role in the bigger social-political picture our cultural surroundings carry.  
With the success of the 2007 production of "Die Maßnahme" (The Measures Taken) bt Bertolt Brecht, director Tore Vagn Lid also brought his already genuine affiliation with Bertolt Brecht's ideas for the theatre to broad daylight, in which his respect  for the composition of theatre-partitatures as realised through the co-creation of works by Brecht and composer Hanns Eisler plays a major part. In terms of the ´brechtian heritage´, Vagn Lid picks up the strings that many other's have left behind; the idea of addressing questions of ideology through the principles of the "lehrstuck", and not the least through the rooms of resonance created through the dramaturgical play between text, music and a rhythmical approach to the audience's receptional senses. This unique reawakening of a still potential form of politically concerned theatre, was one of the main-events of the Bergen International Festival of 2007, and moved on to the young director's programme of Salzburg Festspiele the same year, where the work stood out as "not the work of a young man, but of a young master" (Die Welt).
Transiteatret was with "Die Maßnahme" the first appearance of a Norwegian production at the legendary Salzburg Festival 2008.

Awards

In 2008 the production of "Mann ist Mann" was awarded as "Theatre performance of the year", by the jury of the Hedda-prize (Yearly national awards for outstanding achievements in the professional Norwegian theatre landscape). The production was in particular praised for its ability to combine the resources and traditions of the institutional theatre with the will to experiment of an independent theatre constellation. In 2009 Tore Vagn Lid also received the Heddaprice for the second time for his play "Operasjon Almenrausch", produced by Agder Teater - he also was nominated to the national Ibsen Award for "The play of the year" 2009.

Productions

Current

DUB Leviathan! - Scenisk album av Tore Vagn Lid (Bergen International Festival, 2015)

Previous
 The Gospel of Judas / Judasevangeliet - Sørgespill (Premiere September 11, 2013)
Fatzer by Bertolt Brecht, (Re)construction by Tore Vagn Lid  (Premiere at Bergen International Festival May 25, 2012.)
Sound of Science - a Stage Seminar (site specific - 2011 /2012)
Ressentiment- Pavane til en død prinsesse (2010)
Ut, ut i det grønne! (2010)
Polyfonia-Variasjoner (2010)
Elephant Stories - E. Jelinek, Ùber Tiere / T.V. Lid, "Passacaglia" - (2009) 
Mann = Mann (2008)
Die Massnahme (2007) (Bergen Festival / Salzburg Festival (YDP) 
Polyfonia (2007)
To be continued... (2005/06)
Esse est percipi (2006)
The Great Pop Ambient Pub Quiz Show (2005)
Expanding the Battlezone- audio visual dialogues with Michel Houellebecq (2005)
Maybe it's Too Nice (2004)
Trio for to skuespillere og spansk gitar (2003/04)
Walk Cat, Walk! (2002-2004) (In Engsish)
Opus 1 - Maktens Anatomi (2000/03)

Other/related works by Tore Vagn Lid and the Tt-B team include:
Embargo (2008), Hordaland Teater - 
Operasjon Almenrausch (2008/2009) Vest-Ageder Fylke/ Agder Teater - 
Before Sunrice (G. Haubtmann), Den Nationale Scene (2011)

References

 https://vimeo.com/transiteatret
 http://www.sceneweb.no/en/organisation/51/Tore_Vagn_LidTransiteatret_Bergen-2001-1-1
http://www.transiteatret.com
https://archive.today/20130626190718/http://torevagn.blog.com/
https://archive.today/20130626190040/http://soundofscience.blog.com/
https://archive.today/20130626190329/http://fatzer.blog.com/
https://archive.today/20130626191158/http://judasevangeliet.blog.com/

Theatres in Bergen
Theatre companies in Norway